Robert Joseph Hansen (born May 26, 1948) is an American former professional first baseman who played in Major League Baseball for the Milwaukee Brewers in 1974 and 1976.

Biography
A native of Boston, Massachusetts, Hansen played at the collegiate level at the University of Massachusetts Amherst. From 1966 to 1969, he played four seasons of collegiate summer baseball in the Cape Cod Baseball League (CCBL), three with the Cotuit Kettleers, and a final season with the Orleans Cardinals, and was a three-time CCBL all-star.

Hansen was selected by the Seattle Pilots in the twenty-first round of the 1969 Major League Baseball Draft. He remained in the organization through its move to Milwaukee, Wisconsin to become the Milwaukee Brewers. During his time with the Brewers, he played at the major league level in 1974 and 1976, posting a career batting average of .242 in 158 plate appearances over 82 games.

Hansen was inducted into the Cape Cod Baseball League Hall of Fame in 2008.

References

External links
, or Retrosheet, or Pura Pelota (Venezuelan Winter League)

1948 births
Living people
American expatriate baseball players in Canada
American expatriate baseball players in Japan
American expatriate baseball players in Mexico
Baseball players from Boston
Clinton Pilots players
Cotuit Kettleers players
Crown Lighter Lions players
Evansville Triplets players
Leones de Yucatán players
Major League Baseball first basemen
Milwaukee Brewers players
Navegantes del Magallanes players
American expatriate baseball players in Venezuela
Nippon Professional Baseball first basemen
Orleans Firebirds players
Portland Beavers players
Québec Carnavals players
Sacramento Solons players
Spokane Indians players
UMass Minutemen baseball players